Fortunearia is a monotypic genus of flowering plants belonging to the family Hamamelidaceae. It just contains one species, Fortunearia sinensis Rehder & E.H.Wilson.

It is native to China.

Its genus name is in honour of Robert Fortune (1812–1880), Scottish botanist, plant hunter and traveller in Asia, and the specific epithet sinensis means "from China".

It was first described and published in Plantae Wilsonianae Vol.1 on page 427 in 1913.

References

Hamamelidaceae
Saxifragales genera
Plants described in 1913
Flora of China